Holyoke is an unincorporated community in Holyoke Township, Carlton County, Minnesota, United States.  It is located between Sandstone and Duluth.

Carlton County Road 8 and State Highway 23 (MN 23) are two of the main routes in the community.

Holyoke is located 13 miles south of Wrenshall.  The Nemadji State Forest is nearby.  The communities of Nickerson, MN and Foxboro, WI are near Holyoke.

Further reading
 Rand McNally Road Atlas – 2007 edition – Minnesota entry
 Official State of Minnesota Highway Map – 2011/2012 edition
 Mn/DOT map of Carlton County – 2012 edition

External links
 HolyokeMN.com – Community website – Link

Unincorporated communities in Minnesota
Unincorporated communities in Carlton County, Minnesota